The Bushwick Starr is a non-profit theater in the Brooklyn neighborhood of the same name that was founded in 2007 Sue Kessler and Noel Allain who serve as the executive and artistic director, respectively. They were located on Starr Street until 2020 when their space was sold and they announced the purchase of and relocation to a former dairy plant at 419 Eldert Street.

The Starr is known for its artists, including Jeremy O. Harris and Daniel Fish. They first programmed a full season in 2009 and were firmly a part of the Off Off Broadway community by 2011.

References

Theatres in Brooklyn